Hoscheid is a small town in north-eastern Luxembourg. It was a commune, part of the canton of Diekirch, which was part of the district of Diekirch.

On January 1, 2012, the commune merged with Consthum and Hosingen communes to form Parc Hosingen commune; thereby becoming part of Clervaux canton.

, the town of Hoscheid, which lies in the south of the commune, had a population of 473.

Among local personalities is Jean Ersfeld, who, in 2004, led his party, the Free Party of Luxembourg in the legislative elections.

Former commune
The former commune consisted of the villages:

 Houscheid
 Houscheid-Dickt
 Oberschlinder
 Unterschlinder
 Markebach (lieu-dit)
 Kehrmuhle (lieu-dit)
 Schilkeschleedchen where a firing range of the Luxembourg Armed Forces is located

Communes in Diekirch (canton)
Towns in Luxembourg